The Men's 100 metre backstroke event at the 2015 Southeast Asian Games took place on 6 June 2015 at the OCBC Aquatic Centre in the Singapore Sports Hub.

There were 11 competitors from eight countries who took part in this event. Two heats were held. The heat in which a swimmer competed did not formally matter for advancement, as the swimmers with the top eight times from both field qualified for the finals.

Schedule
All times are Singapore Standard Time (UTC+08:00)

Records 

The following records were established during the competition:

Results

Heats

Final

References

External links

Swimming at the 2015 Southeast Asian Games